Intradermal spindle cell lipoma is distinct in that it most commonly affects women, and has a wide distribution, occurring with relatively equal frequency on the head and neck, trunk, and upper and lower extremities.

See also 
 Spindle cell lipoma
 List of cutaneous conditions

References 

Dermal and subcutaneous growths